The 2022 Phoenix Rising FC season is the club's ninth season in the USL Championship and their sixth as Rising FC. The season ran from March 12 thru October 15.
For the first time as Phoenix Rising FC, the team failed to make the playoffs.

Competitions

Friendlies
All times from this point on Mountain Standard Time (UTC-07:00)

USL Championship

Results by round

Matches

Group table

U.S. Open Cup

As a member of the USL Championship, Phoenix Rising will enter the tournament proper in the Second Round.

Roster

Player transactions

Loan in

Transfer In

Transfer Out

Statistics

One Own Goal scored by Loudoun United FC & Orange County SC.

Goalkeepers

References

2022
Phoenix Rising FC
Phoenix Rising FC
Phoenix Rising FC
Phoenix Rising FC